Duncan McLauchlin "Lauch" Faircloth (born January 14, 1928) is an American politician who served one term as a Republican U.S. Senator from North Carolina.

Before his Senate service, Faircloth was a prominent and wealthy hog farmer. One impetus for his political activism was his disagreement with the increasing regulations targeting large hog farming operations such as his, fueled by an environmentalist and populist backlash.

An active Democrat for many years, Faircloth began his political career as a driver for North Carolina U.S. Senator Kerr Scott, who rewarded his young chargé by helping him get out of service in the Korean War via a hardship discharge. An early supporter of Terry Sanford's 1960 gubernatorial bid, Sanford rewarded him with an appointment to the state highway commission. After helping Robert W. Scott in his bid for the governorship in 1968, Scott named Faircloth chairman of the commission, and he later went on to serve as Secretary of Commerce during Jim Hunt's time as governor. Faircloth aspired to the governor's office himself, but was defeated in the Democratic primary in 1984. He also considered running for the Senate seat being vacated by Senator John East in 1986, but was discouraged by the entry of Sanford, the eventual victor, into the race.

In 1990, after 40 years as a Democrat, Faircloth switched his party registration and began preparations to seek the Republican Senate nomination in 1992. Enjoying the support of Senator Jesse Helms's political organization, Faircloth defeated Charlotte mayor Sue Myrick and former congressman Walter E. Johnston III in the primary. His opponent in the general election was his former ally Terry Sanford, who, although helping Faircloth raise money for his failed gubernatorial bid in 1984, provoked Faircloth's anger two years later when Sanford allegedly denigrated Faircloth's earlier bid for the Senate with alleged comments dismissing Faircloth's chances in a statewide contest against him.  Faircloth attacked Sanford as a tax-and-spend liberal, and despite a mediocre performance in a televised debate that September, Faircloth won the seat by a 100,000-vote margin.

Faircloth served a single term from 1993–99. He once joked that he wanted to be known as the conservative senator from North Carolina; in comparison to the state's other seat held by the arch-conservative Helms.

Campaigning for reelection in 1998, Faircloth lost to Democrat John Edwards. Despite originally being the marginal favorite, Faircloth was beaten by Edwards by 51.2% to 47.0%—a margin of some 83,000 votes. When conceding to Edwards, Faircloth stated to his supporters, "I feel that I let you down...because we should have won."

That night, Washington, D.C. Mayor Marion Barry, with whom Faircloth had had longstanding disagreements about home rule issues, said Faircloth had been "so busy picking on me and the residents of the District of Columbia that he neglected his constituents in North Carolina. Now he can go back and deal with the pigs. Goodbye, Faircloth."

Electoral history

 Write-in and minor candidate notes:  In 1992, Bruce Kimball received 23 votes and Mary Ann Zakutney received 13 votes.

References

External links

Oral History Interviews with Lauch Faircloth ,  from Oral Histories of the American South
 

1928 births
Living people
State cabinet secretaries of North Carolina
North Carolina Democrats
North Carolina Republicans
Farmers from North Carolina
American Presbyterians
Republican Party United States senators from North Carolina
People from Sampson County, North Carolina
Jesse Helms
John Edwards
People from Clinton, North Carolina
Members of Congress who became lobbyists